Two separate events at the Baltic fortress of Kronstadt on Kotlin Island are known as the Kronstadt mutinies. The first took place on 8 November 1904, and was part of the 1904–1907 wave of political and social unrest of what became known as the 1905 Russian Revolution.  The second was the July Days uprising of Russian sailors, soldiers and workers against their officers in July 1917, which was put down by the Russian Provisional Government.
After this Lenin decided to agree to the Bolsheviks going into a more defensive status of operations for a time. This happened during the period of the Russian civil war. 1917–18 sailors in Kronstadt revolted against the whites and then were killed by the Red Army.

See also
 Junker mutiny
 Kronstadt rebellion

1905 Russian Revolution
Russian Revolution
Naval mutinies

References